The 2003 Detroit Lions season was the 74th season in franchise history.

Prior to the season, the Lions hired Steve Mariucci, who was well known for his tenure with the San Francisco 49ers, as their head coach. He spent two and a half seasons with the Lions until his firing in November 2005.

The season saw the team draft Charles Rogers with the second overall pick in the 2003 NFL Draft. However, on-and-off the field issues, and later injuries, interrupted his career. He was released by the Lions in 2006, and immediately went out of the NFL. Much like quarterback Ryan Leaf, Rogers remains one of the biggest draft busts in the contemporary NFL.

During the offseason, the Lions introduced a new logo, with the outline of the lion changing to black. While the Lions improved on their 3–13, second-to-last place finish from last year, they overall didn't put an end to their on-the-field problems, and went 5–11, for their third losing season in a row. This gave the Lions their third consecutive last place finish in their division, tracing back to their 2001 season, their final year in the NFC Central.

Offseason
The Lions bolstered their defense by signing linebacker Earl Holmes, defensive tackle Dan Wilkinson and cornerback Dré Bly.

NFL Draft

Personnel

Staff

Roster

Schedule
In addition to their regular games with NFC North divisional rivals, the Lions played teams from the NFC West and AFC West according to the NFL's schedule rotation, and also played games against the Carolina Panthers and Dallas Cowboys, who had finished fourth in their respective divisions in 2002.

Game summaries

Week 1

Week 9

Standings

References

External links
 2003 Detroit Lions at Pro-Football-Reference.com

Detroit Lions
Detroit Lions seasons
Detroit Lions